Cladophoraceae are a family of green algae in the order the Cladophorales.  This family includes notably the genus Chaetomorpha which has a few members used in saltwater aquariums.

References

External links
 

 
Ulvophyceae families